Puccinia smyrnii, or alexanders rust, is a fungal plant pathogen which causes rust on alexanders (Smyrnium olusatrum). It is found in Europe and north Africa.

References

External links
 Aphotofungi

smyrnii
Fungal plant pathogens and diseases
Fungi described in 1894
Fungi of Africa
Fungi of Europe
Galls